Annexin Pharmaceuticals is a Swedish privately held biotech company developing new therapeutic approaches for inflammatory cardiovascular diseases. The concept for the therapy is based on the anti-inflammatory properties of Annexin A5, a body own protective protein that acts simultaneously against several key pathogenic mechanisms of cardiovascular diseases. The company is currently focusing on treatment of peripheral artery disease (PAD).

References

External links 
 www.annexinpharmaceuticals.com

Pharmaceutical companies of Sweden